Michael Proctor may refer to:
 Michael Proctor (footballer) (born 1980), English footballer
 Michael Proctor (academic) (born 1950), British physicist
 Michael Proctor (gridiron football) (born 1967), American football player
 Michael Proctor (botanist) (1929–2017), English botanist/ecologist

See also 
 Proctor (surname)